Anke-Eve Goldmann was a journalist for Cycle World, Das Motorrad in Germany, Moto Revue in France and other international motorcycle magazines. Goldmann was a friend of author André Pieyre de Mandiargues and the inspiration for the main character, 'Rebecca', in his most popular book The Motorcycle (1963). The book was adapted for the 1968 film The Girl on a Motorcycle starring Marianne Faithfull. From the 1950s, she competed in endurance and circuit racing, at the Nürburgring and Hockenheimring but being a woman, was barred from higher level competitions.

Goldmann taught German to airmen's children at a U.S. Air Force base in Germany. She was the first woman to ride a motorcycle with a one-piece leather racing suit, made for her by German manufacturer Harro. She rode BMW motorcycles and became a spokesperson for the marque before buying an MV Agusta.

In 1958, she helped found the Women's International Motorcycle Association in Europe.

She gave up motorcycling after the death of a close friend.

References

External links
 WIMA
 The Vintagent: Anke-Eve Goldmann
 The Vintagent: Mystery Woman, The Later Years

Motorcycle journalists
Living people
1930 births
Women motorcyclists